Chen King-ming (born 1 May 1958) is a Taiwanese boxer. He competed in the men's flyweight event at the 1984 Summer Olympics.

References

1958 births
Living people
Taiwanese male boxers
Olympic boxers of Taiwan
Boxers at the 1984 Summer Olympics
Place of birth missing (living people)
Flyweight boxers
20th-century Taiwanese people